The Une Formation (Kiu) is a geological formation of the Altiplano Cundiboyacense, Eastern Ranges of the Colombian Andes.

Etymology 
The formation was defined in 1957 by Hubach after Une, Cundinamarca.

Description

Lithologies 
Fossils of Heminautilus etheringtoni have been found in the Une Formation.

Stratigraphy and depositional environment 
The Une Formation, part of the Villeta Group, overlies the Fómeque Formation and is overlain by the Chipaque Formation. The age has been estimated to be Albian-Cenomanian. Stratigraphically, the formation is time equivalent with the Simijaca, Aguardiente, Caballos and Pacho Formations. The formation has been deposited in a near shore deltaic environment.

Outcrops 

The Une Formation is apart from its type locality, found on the Sumapaz Páramo.

Regional correlations

See also 

 Geology of the Eastern Hills
 Geology of the Ocetá Páramo
 Geology of the Altiplano Cundiboyacense

Notes

References

Bibliography

Maps

External links 
 

Geologic formations of Colombia
Cretaceous Colombia
Upper Cretaceous Series of South America
Lower Cretaceous Series of South America
Albian Stage
Cenomanian Stage
Sandstone formations
Deltaic deposits
Shallow marine deposits
Reservoir rock formations
Formations
Geography of Cundinamarca Department
Geography of Boyacá Department
Muysccubun